Otoyol 52, abbreviated as O-52,  Adana-Şanlıurfa Otoyolu, is a toll motorway in the regions of Mediterranean and Southeastern Anatolia in Turkey, connecting the cities Adana and Şanlıurfa. The motorway is part of European route E90 and Asian Highway 84. The O-52 starts from the eastern terminus of The O-51, runs eastward through Osmaniye, Gaziantep and terminates east of Şanlıurfa. The O-52 is currently the second longest Motorway in Turkey being only 5 km shorter than the O-4.

The highway sustained damage in the 2023 Turkey–Syria earthquake.

Exit list

Light blue indicates toll section of motorway.

See also
 List of highways in Turkey
 Kızlaç Tunnel
 Aslanlı Tunnel
 Ayran Tunnel
 Taşoluk Tunnel

References

External links
 Turkish General Directorate of Highways. Turkey road map.
List of exits on O-52

52
Transport in Adana Province
Transport in Gaziantep Province
Transport in Kahramanmaraş Province
Transport in Osmaniye Province
Transport in Şanlıurfa Province
Toll roads in Turkey
Buildings damaged by the 2023 Turkey–Syria earthquake